Rachael Burford (born 19 August 1986) is an English rugby union player. She represented  at the 2006, 2010, 2014 and 2017 Women's Rugby World Cups. She was a member of the squad which went to the 2013 Rugby World Cup Sevens.

In May 2014, Burford was awarded the Rugby Players' Association England women's player of the year award.

References

External links
 Player profile

1986 births
Living people
England women's international rugby union players
English female rugby union players
Female rugby sevens players
Rugby union players from Kent
England international women's rugby sevens players